Loïc Négo (born 15 January 1991) is a professional footballer who plays as a right-back for Fehérvár. Born in France, he plays for the Hungary national team.

Club career
On 18 June 2008, he signed his first professional contract agreeing to a three-year deal with FC Nantes until June 2011. Négo made his professional debut on 14 May 2010 in a league match against Caen appearing as a half-time substitute in a 3–1 defeat.

Négo joined Roma on a five-year contract following the conclusion of the 2011 FIFA U-20 World Cup.

On 29 January 2014, Négo signed a three-and-a-half year deal with Championship side Charlton Athletic for an undisclosed fee, ahead of their fixture against Wigan Athletic where he made his league debut for the club.

In August 2014, Négo rejoined Újpest on a season long loan deal.

On 31 August 2015, Négo joined Fehérvár FC on a permanent deal.

International career

France 
Négo was born in France and is of Guadeloupean descent. He is a French youth international and has represented his nation at all levels of youth for which he is eligible. Négo was a part of the team that won the 2010 UEFA European Under-19 Football Championship on home soil.

Hungary 
In February 2019, Négo acquired Hungarian citizenship via naturalization. On 8 October 2020, he debuted for the Hungary national team against Bulgaria in the play-offs of Euro 2020. On 12 November 2020, he scored his first goal for Hungary against Iceland in the UEFA Euro 2020 qualifying play-offs at the Puskás Aréna. Just two minutes after his goal, Dominik Szoboszlai took the lead and Hungary won 2–1 against Iceland and qualified for the UEFA Euro 2020.

On 1 June 2021, Négo was included in the final 26-man squad to represent Hungary at the rescheduled UEFA Euro 2020 tournament.

Career statistics

Club

International

Scores and results list Hungary's goal tally first, score column indicates score after each Négo goal.

Honours

Club
Újpest
Magyar Kupa: 2013–14
Szuperkupa: 2014

Fehérvár
Nemzeti Bajnokság I: 2017–18
Magyar Kupa: 2018–19; runner-up: 2020–21

International
France U19
 UEFA European Under-19 Football Championship: 2010

References

External links
 
 
 
 

1991 births
Living people
Footballers from Paris
Hungarian footballers
Hungary international footballers
French footballers
France youth international footballers
French emigrants to Hungary
Hungarian people of Guadeloupean descent
French people of Guadeloupean descent
Association football defenders
FC Nantes players
A.S. Roma players
Standard Liège players
Újpest FC players
Charlton Athletic F.C. players
Fehérvár FC players
Ligue 2 players
Belgian Pro League players
Nemzeti Bajnokság I players
UEFA Euro 2020 players
French expatriate footballers
Hungarian expatriate footballers
Expatriate footballers in Italy
Expatriate footballers in Belgium
Expatriate footballers in England
French expatriate sportspeople in Italy
French expatriate sportspeople in Belgium
French expatriate sportspeople in England
Naturalized citizens of Hungary